The Battle of Krefeld (sometimes referred to by its French name of Créfeld) was a battle fought at Krefeld near the Rhine on 23 June 1758 between a Prussian-Hanoverian army and a French army during the Seven Years' War.

Background

The Hanoverian army led by Ferdinand, brother of the duke of Brunswick, had driven the French led by the Comte de Clermont back across the Rhine. Ferdinand's own army had crossed to the left bank of the Rhine and was now in a position to threaten the frontier of France itself. The Battle of Rheinberg fought on 12 June proved indecisive. Clermont, who had recently replaced the Duc de Richelieu in command of the French army, was attempting to stem Ferdinand's advance. He chose a defensive line on the south side of a walled canal running roughly east and west. Thus the walled canal constituted a sort of natural fortification that Clermont thought would be easy to defend.

Battle
The allied Prussian and Hanoverian troops led by the Duke of Brunswick seized the initiative attacking the entrenched defensive French forces. After feigning an attack against Clermont's own right flank, Ferdinand executed a wide flanking march, crossing the canal out of sight of the French and emerging from a wooded area on Clermont's left flank. Clermont, who had just sat down for a midday meal, was late in sending reinforcements and, as a result, his left flank was crushed.

The Comte de Gisors, the popular, charismatic, only child of the French minister of war, the Duc de Belle-Isle, was mortally wounded while charging at the head of the French Carabiniers. The Comte de St. Germain, who commanded the French left wing, was nevertheless able to put together a sufficient defense to prevent a complete rout, and the French army retired from the field in relatively good order.

Aftermath
The Erbprinz, son of the ruling Duke of Brunswick-Wolfenbüttel, who later died of wounds received at the battle of Jena during the Napoleonic Wars, particularly distinguished himself commanding the allied flanking troops. Clermont asked to be relieved of his command after this defeat, and his wish was granted. He was succeeded in command by Marshal de Contades.

Notes

References

External links
 

1758 in the Holy Roman Empire
Battles involving France
Battles involving Great Britain
Battles involving Hesse-Kassel
Battles of the Seven Years' War
Battle of Krefeld
Battles in North Rhine-Westphalia
History of the Rhineland
Battles of the Silesian Wars
Battle